I Am the Actor is a Chinese variety program produced by Zhejiang Television. The show is hosted by Zhang Guoli and Yi Yi, and features Wu Xiubo, Xu Zheng and Zhang Ziyi as mentors. The first season of the show was called Birth of Performers, and Zhejiang TV renamed the show as I Am the Actor in the second season, which began airing in September 2018.

After becoming a hit in China, Zhejiang TV formed a partnership in November 2018 with the American company IOI (founded by Lisa Kudrow and Dan Bucatinsky) to co-produce an English version of the show for the global audience.

Guests
 Episode 1:
Xu Jiao, Hu Xianxu
 Ren Suxi (任素汐), Zuo Xiaoqing
 Song Yang (宋洋), Du Chun
 Episode 2:
 Janine Chang, Zhang Xinyu
 Kan Qingzi (阚清子), Xu Lu
 Tu Songyan (涂松岩), Qi Xi (齐溪)
 Episode 3:
 Lan Xi (斓曦), Wang Yuanke (王媛可), Yang Rong
 Jin Shijia, Song Yi (宋轶)
 Sun Qian (孙茜), Zhang Xiaofei (张小斐)
 Episode 4:
 Li Xiaomeng (李小萌), Li Qian
 Li Landi (李兰迪), Han Xue
 Li Chun, He Hongshan
 Episode 5:
 Yang Di (杨迪), Cao Bingkun (曹炳琨), Baby Zhang, Wang Maolei (王茂蕾)
 Hai Lu (海陆), Jiang Mengjie, Zhang Xincheng
 Li Nian (李念), Wang Xiaochen (王晓晨)
 Episode 6:
 Guo Qilin (郭麒麟), Jing Chao (经超), Cao Jun (曹骏)
 Xue Jianing (薛佳凝), Cao Xiwen, Wang Yang (王阳)
 Episode 7:
Liu Huan, Lin Peng, Li Sheng (李晟)
 Shen Chunyang (沉春阳), Du Ruoxi (杜若溪)
 Sun Jian (孙坚), Zhang Meng (张萌), Tan Jianci (檀健次), Jiang Kaitong (江铠同), Fang Zibin (房子斌), Fan Tiantian (范湉湉)
 Episode 8:
 Zhang Zhilü (张植绿), He Dujuan (何杜娟), Hong Bingyao (洪冰瑶), Shao Weitong (邵伟桐)
 Yin Xiaotian (印小天), Han Dong (韩栋), Jia Chenfei (贾晨飞), Yu Xiaotong (于小彤)
 Liu Yase (刘雅瑟), Gao Xiaofei (高晓菲), Tian Yuan, Wang Wanjuan (王婉娟)

Episodes

References 

2018 Chinese television series debuts
Chinese-language television shows
Chinese variety television shows